Luxembourg participated in the 2010 Summer Youth Olympics in Singapore.

The Luxembourg squad consisted of five athletes competing in two sports: aquatics (swimming) and athletics.

Athletics

Girls
Track and Road Events

Field Events

Swimming

References

External links
Competitors List: Luxembourg

Nations at the 2010 Summer Youth Olympics
2010 in Luxembourgian sport
Luxembourg at the Youth Olympics